This article contains a list of fossil-bearing stratigraphic units in the state of Maryland, U.S.

Sites

See also

 Paleontology in Maryland

References

 

Maryland
Stratigraphic units
Stratigraphy of Maryland
Maryland geography-related lists
United States geology-related lists